Geneva Lewis (born ) is a violinist from New Zealand, now living in the United States.

Lewis was born in Auckland, New Zealand. Her father is Chris Lewis, a former professional tennis player. She began playing the violin at the age of three. Living in Irvine, she is currently studying with Aimee Kreston at the Colburn Community School of Performing Arts in Los Angeles; Kreston has tutored Lewis since age seven.

Lewis won the gold medal in her division at the Fischoff in May 2015 as a member of the Incendium Quartet, and has won the Grand Prize of the ENKOR Competition. In addition, she competed in the Menuhin competition in 2014.

She currently studies with famed violinist and pedagogue Miriam Fried at New England Conservatory of Music and serves as acting concertmaster for the Atlantic Symphony Orchestra, located on Boston's South Shore.

In May 2022 she joined the BBC Radio 3 New Generation Artists scheme.

External link
Geneva Lewis website

References

Living people
Date of birth missing (living people)
New Zealand expatriates in the United States
American violinists
People from Irvine, California
Musicians from Auckland
21st-century violinists
Year of birth missing (living people)